Dano-Norwegian (Danish and ) was a koiné/mixed language that evolved among the urban elite in Norwegian cities during the later years of the union between the Kingdoms of Denmark and Norway (1536/1537–1814). It is from this koiné that the unofficial written standard Riksmål and the official written standard Bokmål developed. Bokmål is now the most widely used written standard of contemporary Norwegian.

History

As a spoken language
During the period when Norway was in a union with Denmark, Norwegian writing died out and Danish became the language of the literate class in Norway. At first, Danish was used primarily in writing; later it came to be spoken on formal or official occasions; and by the time Norway's ties with Denmark were severed in 1814, a Dano-Norwegian vernacular often called the "cultivated everyday speech" had become the mother tongue of parts of the urban elite. This new Dano-Norwegian koiné could be described as Danish with Norwegian pronunciation, some Norwegian vocabulary, and some minor grammatical differences from Danish.

As a written language
In the late middle ages and early modern age, the Scandinavian languages went through great changes, as they were influenced in particular by Low German. Written Danish language mostly found its modern form in the 17th century, based on the vernacular of the educated classes of Copenhagen. At the time, Copenhagen was the capital of Denmark–Norway, and Danish was used as an official written language in Norway at the time of the dissolution of the Dano-Norwegian union in 1814. In Norway it was generally referred to as Norwegian, particularly after the dissolution of the Dano-Norwegian union.

During the 19th century, spoken Dano-Norwegian language gradually came to incorporate more of Norwegian vocabulary and grammar. At the start of the 20th century, written Dano-Norwegian was mostly identical with written Danish, with only minor differences, such as some additional Norwegian vocabulary in Dano-Norwegian. In 1907 and 1917, spelling and grammar reforms brought the written language closer to the spoken koiné (Dano-Norwegian). Based on the Danish model, the Dano-Norwegian language in Norway was referred to as Rigsmål, later spelled Riksmål, from the late 19th century, and this name was officially adopted in the early 20th century. In 1929, the name Riksmål was officially changed to Bokmål after a proposition to use the name dansk-norsk lost with a single vote in the Lagting (a chamber in the Norwegian parliament).

In the mid-19th century, a new written language, Landsmål, based on selected rural Norwegian dialects, was launched as an alternative to Dano-Norwegian, but it did not replace the existing written language. Landsmål, renamed Nynorsk, is currently used by around 12% of the population, mostly in western Norway; it had reached its height in the 1940s. The Norwegian language conflict is an ongoing controversy within Norwegian culture and politics related to these two official versions of the Norwegian language.

Modern developments

Nowadays, the term Bokmål officially refers only to the written language of that name (and possibly to its use in the media, by actors etc.). There are, however, a number of spoken varieties of Norwegian that are close or largely identical to written Bokmål, sometimes even in a conservative form similar to historical Dano-Norwegian - notably, the higher sociolect in Oslo and in other cities in Eastern Norway. Over the years the spoken Dano-Norwegian standard and its successors, on the one hand, and Modern Norwegian dialects on the other hand have influenced each other. Nowadays, no clear dividing line can be drawn between the two.

The term Dano-Norwegian is seldom used with reference to contemporary Bokmål and its spoken varieties. The nationality of the language has been a hotly debated topic, and its users and proponents have generally not been fond of the implied association with Danish (hence the neutral names Riksmål and Bokmål, meaning state language and literary language respectively). The debate intensified with the advent of a new Norwegian written language in the 19th century, now known as Nynorsk, which is based on Modern Norwegian dialects and puristic opposition to Danish and Dano-Norwegian. Historically, many Nynorsk supporters have held that Nynorsk is the only genuinely Norwegian language, since Riksmål/Bokmål is a relic of the dual monarchy; therefore, the term Dano-Norwegian applied to Bokmål can be used to stigmatize or delegitimize the language. Many Bokmål users consider this association to be offensive, and it is therefore mainly confined to the Nynorsk-supporting side of heated discussions.

See also 
Gøtudanskt
Svorsk

Notes

Norwegian language
Danish language
Denmark–Norway